Pinus, the pines, is a genus of approximately 111 extant tree and shrub species.  The genus is currently split into two subgenera: subgenus Pinus (hard pines), and subgenus Strobus (soft pines). Each of the subgenera have been further divided into sections based on chloroplast DNA sequencing and whole plastid genomic analysis. Older classifications split the genus into three subgenera – subgenus Pinus, subgenus Strobus, and subgenus Ducampopinus (pinyon, bristlecone and lacebark pines) – based on cone, seed and leaf characteristics.  DNA phylogeny has shown that species formerly in subgenus Ducampopinus are members of subgenus Strobus, so Ducampopinus is no longer used.

The species of subgenus Ducampopinus were regarded as intermediate between the other two subgenera. In the modern classification, they are placed into subgenus Strobus, yet they did not fit entirely well in either so they were classified in a third subgenus. In 1888 the Californian botanist John Gill Lemmon placed them in subgenus Pinus. In general, this classification emphasized cone, cone scale, seed, and leaf fascicle and sheath morphology, and species in each subsection were usually recognizable by their general appearance. Pines with one fibrovascular bundle per leaf, (the former subgenera Strobus and Ducampopinus) were known as haploxylon pines, while pines with two fibrovascular bundles per leaf, (subgenus Pinus) were called diploxylon pines. Diploxylon pines tend to have harder timber and a larger amount of resin than the haploxylon pines. The current division into two subgenera (Pinus and Strobus) is supported with rigorous genetic evidence.

Several features are used to distinguish the subgenera, sections, and subsections of pines: the number of leaves (needles) per fascicle, whether the fascicle sheaths are deciduous or persistent, the number of fibrovascular bundles per needle (2 in Pinus or 1 in Strobus), the position of the resin ducts in the needles (internal or external), the presence or shape of the seed wings (absent, rudimentary, articulate, and adnate), and the position of the umbo (dorsal or terminal) and presence of a prickle on the scales of the seed cones.

Both subgenera are thought to have a very ancient divergence from one another, having diverged during the late Jurassic.

Subgenus Pinus  
Subgenus Pinus includes the yellow and hard pines. Pines in this subgenus have one to five needles per fascicle and two fibrovascular bundles per needle, and the fascicle sheaths are persistent, except in P. leiophylla and P. lumholtzii. Cone scales are thicker and more rigid than those of subgenus Strobus, and cones either open soon after they mature or are serotinous.

Section Pinus
Section Pinus has two or three needles per fascicle. Cones of all species have thick scales, and all except those of P. pinea open at maturity. Species in this section are native to Europe, Asia, and the Mediterranean, except for P. resinosa in northeastern North America and P. tropicalis in western Cuba.

 Subsection Incertae sedis
†P. driftwoodensis – Early Eocene, British Columbia, Canada

Subsection Pinus

All but two species (P. resinosa  and  P. tropicalis) in Subsection Pinus are native to Eurasia.
P. densata – Sikang pine
P. densiflora – Korean red pine
P. henryi – Henry's pine
P. hwangshanensis – Huangshan pine
P. kesiya – Khasi pine
P. latteri? – Tenasserim pine
P. luchuensis – Luchu pine
P. massoniana – Masson's pine
P. merkusii – Sumatran pine
P. mugo – mountain pine
P. nigra – European black pine
†P. prehwangshanensis 
P. resinosa – red pine
P. sylvestris – Scots pine
P. tabuliformis – Chinese red pine
P. taiwanensis – Taiwan red pine
P. thunbergii – Japanese black pine
P. tropicalis – tropical pine
P. uncinata
P. yunnanensis – Yunnan pine

Subsection Pinaster

Subsection Pinaster contains species native to the Mediterranean, as well as P. roxburghii from the Himalayas. The scales of its cones lack spines. It is named after P. pinaster.
P. brutia – Turkish pine
P. canariensis – Canary Island pine
P. halepensis – Aleppo pine
P. heldreichii – Bosnian pine
P. pinaster – maritime pine
P. pinea – stone pine 
P. roxburghii – chir pine

Section Trifoliae
Section Trifoliae (American hard pines), despite its name (which means "three-leaved"), has two to five needles per fascicle, or rarely eight. The cones of most species open at maturity, but a few are serotinous. All but two American hard pines belong to this section.

Phylogenetic analysis supports ancient divergences within this section, with subsections Australes and Ponderosae having diverged during the mid-Cretaceous.

Subsection Australes

Subsection Australes is native to North and Central America and islands in the Caribbean.

The closed-cone (serotinous) species of California and Baja California, P. attenuata, P. muricata, and P. radiata, are sometimes placed in a separate subsection, Attenuatae.
P. attenuata – knobcone pine
P. caribaea – Caribbean pine
P. cubensis – Cuban pine
P. echinata – shortleaf pine
P. elliottii – slash pine
†P. foisyi – extinct
P. glabra – spruce pine
P. greggii – Gregg's pine
P. herrerae – Herrera's pine
P. jaliscana – Jalisco pine
P. lawsonii – Lawson's pine
P. leiophylla – Chihuahua pine
P. lumholtzii – Lumholtz's pine
P. luzmariae
†P. matthewsii – Pliocene, Yukon Territory, Canada
P. muricata – bishop pine
P. occidentalis – Hispaniolan pine
P. oocarpa – egg-cone pine
P. palustris – longleaf pine
P. patula – patula pine
P. praetermissa – McVaugh's pine
P. pringlei – Pringle's pine
P. pungens – Table Mountain pine
P. radiata – Monterey pine
P. rigida – pitch pine
P. serotina – pond pine
P. taeda – loblolly pine
P. tecunumanii – Tecun Uman pine
P. teocote – ocote pine

Subsection Contortae
Subsection Contortae is native to North America and Mexico.
P. banksiana – jack pine
P. clausa – sand pine
P. contorta contorta – shore pine
P. contorta latifolia – lodgepole pine
P. virginiana – Virginia pine

Subsection Ponderosae

Subsection Ponderosae is native to Central America, Mexico, the western United States, and southwestern Canada, although its former range was possibly much wider as evidenced by upper Miocene fossils belonging to this subsection found in Japan 

P. arizonica – Arizona pine
P. cooperi – Cooper's pine
P. coulteri – Coulter pine
P. devoniana – Michoacan pine
P. douglasiana
P. durangensis – Durango pine
P. engelmannii – Apache pine
†P. fujiii
P. hartwegii – Hartweg's pine
P. jeffreyi – Jeffrey pine
†P. johndayensis – Oligocene
P. maximinoi – thinleaf pine
P. montezumae – Montezuma pine
P. ponderosa – ponderosa pine
Pinus ponderosa var. willamettensis - Willamette Valley Ponderosa Pine
P. pseudostrobus – smooth-bark Mexican pine
P. sabiniana – gray pine
P. torreyana – Torrey pine

Subgenus Strobus  

Subgenus Strobus includes the white and soft pines. Pines in this subgenus have one to five needles per fascicle and one fibrovascular bundle per needle, and the fascicle sheaths are deciduous, except in P. nelsonii, where they are persistent. Cone scales are thinner and more flexible than those of subgenus Pinus, except in some species like P. maximartinezii, and cones usually open soon after they mature.

Section Parrya
Section Parrya has one to five needles per fascicle. The seeds either have articulate (jointed) wings or no wings at all. In all species except for P. nelsonii, the fascicle sheaths curl back to form a rosette before falling away. The cones have thick scales and release the seeds at maturity. This section is native to the southwestern United States and Mexico.

Subsection Balfourianae
Subsection Balfourianae]] (bristlecone pines) is native to southwest United States.
P. aristata – Rocky Mountains bristlecone pine
P. balfouriana – foxtail pine
P. longaeva – Great Basin bristlecone pine

Subsection Cembroides[[Pinyon pine|Subsection Cembroides (pinyons or piñons) is native to Mexico and the southwestern United States.
P. cembroides – Mexican pinyon
P. culminicola – Potosi pinyon
P. discolor – border pinyon
P. edulis – Colorado pinyon
P. johannis – Johann's pinyon
P. maximartinezii – big-cone pinyon
P. monophylla – single-leaf pinyon
P. orizabensis – Orizaba pinyon
P. pinceana – weeping pinyon
P. quadrifolia – Parry pinyon
P. remota – Texas pinyon or papershell pinyon
P. rzedowskii – Rzedowski's pinyon

Subsection Nelsonianae
Subsection Nelsonianae is native to northeastern Mexico. It consists of the single species with persistent fascicle sheaths.
P. nelsonii – Nelson's pinyon

Section Quinquefoliae
Section Quinquefoliae (white pines), as its name (which means "five-leaved") suggests, has five needles per fascicle except for P. krempfii, which has two, and P. gerardiana and P. bungeana, which have three. All species have cones with thin or thick scales that open at maturity or do not open at all; none are serotinous. Species in this section are found in Eurasia and North America, and one species, P. chiapensis reaches Guatemala.

Subsection Gerardianae
Subsection Gerardianae is native to East Asia. It has three or five needles per fascicle.
P. bungeana – lacebark pine
P. gerardiana – chilgoza pine
P. squamata – Qiaojia pine

Subsection Krempfianae
Subsection Krempfianae Currently native to Vietnam, with a fossil record extending into the Oligocene. It has two needles per fascicle, and they are atypically flattened. The cone scales are thick and have no prickles. Until 2021, the subsection was considered monotypic, when an Oligocene fossil species was described from Yunnan Province, China.
P. krempfii – Krempf's pine
†P. leptokrempfii – Oligocene

Subsection Strobus

Subsection Strobus has five needles per fascicle and thin cone scales with no prickles. Needles tend to be flexible and soft with slightly lighter side underneath. It is native to North and Central America, Europe, and Asia.
P. albicaulis – whitebark pine
P. amamiana – Yakushima white pine
P. armandii – Chinese white pine
P. ayacahuite – Mexican white pine
P. bhutanica – Bhutan white pine
P. cembra – Swiss pine
P. chiapensis – Chiapas pine
P. dabeshanensis – Dabieshan pine
P. dalatensis – Vietnamese white pine
P. fenzeliana – Hainan white pine
P. flexilis – limber pine
P. koraiensis – Korean pine
P. lambertiana – sugar pine
P. monticola – western white pine
P. morrisonicola – Taiwan white pine
P. parviflora – Japanese white pine
P. hakkodensis – Hakkoda pine
P. peuce – Macedonian pine
P. pumila – Siberian dwarf pine
P. sibirica – Siberian pine
P. strobus – eastern white pine
P. strobiformis – Southwestern white pine (also Chihuahuan)
Pinus stylesii
P. wallichiana – blue pine
P. wangii – Guangdong white pine

Incertae sedis

Species which are not placed in a subgenus at this time.
†Pinus latahensis - Early Eocene, Klondike Mountain Formation, Allenby Formation - Okanagan Highlands Floras
†Pinus macrophylla - - Early Eocene, Klondike Mountain Formation, Allenby Formation - Okanagan Highlands Floras
†Pinus peregrinus – Middle Eocene, Golden Valley Formation, North Dakota, USA
†Pinus tetrafolia - Early Eocene, Klondike Mountain Formation - Okanagan Highlands Floras

See also 

Hybridization in pines (list of pine hybrids)

References

Bibliography

External links

Tree of Life Web – favors classification of Ducampopinus species in Strobus.
NCBI Taxonomy server – files Ducampopinus species above as Strobus.

Pinus
Pinus
Pinus